Splitsvilla 8 was hosted by Rannvijay Singh. Karan Kundra also appeared on the show to host a couple of segments. This season saw fourteen girls and eight boys from the auditions, and eight celebrity boys. Subuhi Joshi from Splitsvilla 6 re-entered the show as a queen. The season's theme was "What Women Love". The season was talked about due to two contestants Karishma and Gaurav being confident and indicating that they had bisexual tones. Gaurav had to quit due to illness.

The primary rule of the show is that those who are already in a relationship outside the villa are not permitted to participate. Since two contestants Ish and Viren broke this rule, they were eliminated.

Contestants

References

2015 Indian television seasons